Kim Bong-hyeon (born 11 May 1975) is a South Korean gymnast. He competed at the 1996 Summer Olympics.

References

External links
 

1975 births
Living people
South Korean male artistic gymnasts
Olympic gymnasts of South Korea
Gymnasts at the 1996 Summer Olympics
Place of birth missing (living people)
20th-century South Korean people